The Sunday Trading Act 1994 is an Act of the Parliament of the United Kingdom governing the right of shops in England and Wales to trade on a Sunday. Buying and selling on Sunday had previously been illegal, with exceptions, under the Shops Act 1950.

Background
Large retail park shops usually open 1100-1700, with supermarkets more usually choosing 1000-1600. In Central London, for example on Oxford Street, many shops choose to open from 1200-1800. This includes large 24-hour supermarkets, which meant that supermarkets have to close on Saturday night to allow six continuous hours of shopping within the allotted time.

However, some of the stores open half an hour earlier to allow people to "browse", but do not allow sales before the allotted time. Deliveries to the large stores are not permitted to be loaded or unloaded before 0900. Large shops were excluded from opening on Easter Sunday and Christmas Day (when it fell on a Sunday), but the Christmas Day (Trading) Act 2004 made it illegal for large shops to open on Christmas Day regardless of whatever day of the week it falls upon.

Shops in Scotland, where Sunday trading had always been generally unregulated, retained the right to open at any time. However, the right for workers in Scotland to refuse to work on a Sunday was later conferred by the Sunday Working (Scotland) Act 2003. Northern Ireland has separate laws governing Sunday opening.

The Sunday Trading Bill had met with considerable opposition from the Lord's Day Observance Society and other groups such as the Keep Sunday Special campaign, a coalition body which includes the shopworkers' trade union USDAW. USDAW finally agreed to support six-hour Sunday trading in return for a promise that Sunday working would be strictly voluntary. This decision played an important role in encouraging many Labour MPs to back the bill in a free vote. They asked for a guarantee of premium pay, but the Government's position was that that was a matter for negotiation between shopworkers or their unions and their employers and the Act says nothing about the rate of pay for Sunday working.

2012 suspension
In the run up to the 2012 Olympic Games, the Sunday Trading (London Olympic Games and Paralympic Games) Act 2012 was passed stipulating that Sunday trading laws would be suspended by the government on eight weekends from 22 July during the Olympics and Paralympics. This was a temporary measure, and the relaxation expired at the end of the summer.

Ongoing debate
The debate over Sunday trading laws was reignited in 2014, when a ComRes poll commissioned by pressure group 'Open Sundays' revealed that 72% of people believe they should be able to shop whenever is convenient to them. The debate gained further political traction in May of the same year, when Philip Davies MP tabled five amendments to the Deregulation Bill which aimed at abolishing or liberalising the current Sunday trading laws. Although these amendments were ultimately rejected, the debate continued to receive attention, with Davies appearing on the BBC's Daily Politics on 2 July 2014 and labelling the current regulations as "completely absurd and unjustifiable".

It was proposed in the July 2015 Budget that the Sunday trading laws might be relaxed and shops over  be able to open longer. However this proposal was defeated in a House of Commons vote.

Exemptions
Some categories of large shops are exempt from the Sunday Trading Act 1994:

Airport shops
Pharmacies
Goods from exhibition stalls
Farm shops that sell their own produce (including fishmongers)
Petrol filling stations
Railway stations
Motorway service stations

Small shops with a floor area of under and up to 280 square metres (3,000 square feet) may open if they wish to.

See also
Sunday trading
Keep Sunday Special
Blue law (US and Canada)
Sunday Sabbatarianism

References

United Kingdom Acts of Parliament 1994
Retailing in England
1994 in economics
Working time
Sunday shopping
Retailing in Wales
1994 in England
1994 in Wales
United Kingdom labour law
Trade in the United Kingdom
July 1994 events in the United Kingdom
August 1994 events in the United Kingdom